Kornelia Kashiimbindjola Shilunga (born 25 May 1970, Okadila, Oshana Region) is a Namibian politician and member of the National Assembly since 2015, she currently serves as the Deputy Minister of Mines and Energy. and became the first women Deputy Minister at the Ministry.  Shilunga constructed a satisfactory employment history.  The assiduous Deputy Minister worked in various positions as a teacher and a registered nurse.

Education 
Shilunga holds two master's degrees, one in Business Administration with Eastern Southern Africa Management Institute (ESAMI), and another master's degree in Public Policy and Administration from the University of Namibia (UNAM). A bachelor's degree in Nursing Education and Community Health and a Diploma in Nursing Science General, Community Psychiatry and Midwifery Sciences, also from the University of Namibia and matriculated at Gabriel Taapopi Senior Secondary School in Ongwediva in 1989

Career 
She worked at the Office of the President as a Liaison Officer for the Department of Women Affairs, where she headed two regions, respectively Oshana and Omusati Region, Hon. Shilunga has been an entrepreneur for the past nine years, she also worked for the Ministry of Gender and Child Welfare where she held the position of a Chief Liaison Officer. Shilunga is an entrepreneur, a member of the Advisory Committee of Skill Share International in Namibia, a member of the Women and Child Protection Unit Committee and a member of the Prison's Zonal Release Board in the Ministry of Safety and Security.

Interests 
Her interest include energy and extractive industries and serves as the Patron of the World Energy Council Namibia, is the Chairperson of the Namibian Energy Council and the Patron for the Women in Mining Association of Namibia.

References

1970 births
Living people
Members of the National Assembly (Namibia)
People from Oshana Region
SWAPO politicians
Government ministers of Namibia
21st-century Namibian women politicians
21st-century Namibian politicians
Women government ministers of Namibia
Women members of the National Assembly (Namibia)
Namibian businesspeople
University of Namibia alumni